Taida may be:
Tianjin Taida, Chinese football club based in Tianjin
Taida Pasić, Yugoslav-born refugee in the Netherlands
A colloquial name for National Taiwan University, Taipei, Taiwan
 Taida, or Taite, An ancient Assyrian city